Herry Saliku Biembe (born 14 May 1981) is a boxer from Democratic Republic of the Congo who qualified for the 2008 Olympics at middleweight.

At the 2nd AIBA African 2008 Olympic Qualifying Tournament the previously unknown Biembe won second place, even though he was shut out in the final by Badou Jack of Gambia.

In the Olympics, he lost his opening bout to Georgios Gazis of Greece and was eliminated.

References

External links
 
Herry Saliku Biembe's profile at NBC Olympics

1981 births
Living people
Sportspeople from Kinshasa
Middleweight boxers
Boxers at the 2008 Summer Olympics
Democratic Republic of the Congo male boxers
Olympic boxers of the Democratic Republic of the Congo
21st-century Democratic Republic of the Congo people